Clavatula strebeli is a species of sea snail, a marine gastropod mollusk in the family Clavatulidae.

Description
The shell grows to a length of 30 mm.

Distribution
This species occurs in the Atlantic Ocean along Gabon.

References

 Bernard, P.A. (Ed.) (1984). Coquillages du Gabon [Shells of Gabon]. Pierre A. Bernard: Libreville, Gabon. 140, 75 plates pp

External links
 

strebeli
Gastropods described in 1952